The President of the Family Division is the head of the Family Division of the High Court of Justice in England and Wales and Head of Family Justice. The Family Division was created in 1971 when Admiralty and contentious probate cases were removed from its predecessor, the Probate, Divorce and Admiralty Division.

The current President of the Family Division is Sir Andrew McFarlane. Sir James Munby retired as president on 27 July 2018.

Presidents of the Probate, Divorce and Admiralty Division

 1 November 1875: Sir James Hannen
 29 January 1891: Sir Charles Butt
 2 June 1892: Sir Francis Jeune
 30 January 1905: Sir Gorell Barnes
 10 February 1909: Sir John Bigham
 9 March 1910: Sir Samuel Evans
 18 October 1918: Sir William Pickford (The Lord Sterndale from November 1918)
 31 October 1919: Sir Henry Duke (The Lord Merrivale from 1925)
 2 October 1933: Sir Boyd Merriman (The Lord Merriman from 1941)
 8 February 1962: Sir Jocelyn Simon (The Lord Simon of Glaisdale from February 1971)
 20 April 1971: Sir George Baker (President of the Family Division after the relevant provisions of the Administration of Justice Act 1970 came into force on 1 October 1971)

Presidents of the Family Division
 1 October 1971: Sir George Baker (President of the Probate, Divorce and Admiralty Division before the relevant provisions of the Administration of Justice Act 1970 came into force on 1 October 1971)
 28 September 1979: Sir John Arnold
 11 January 1988: Sir Stephen Brown
 1 October 1999: Dame Elizabeth Butler-Sloss
 7 April 2005: Sir Mark Potter
 13 April 2010: Sir Nicholas Wall (Retired 1 December 2012)
11 January 2013: Sir James Munby
28 July 2018: Sir Andrew McFarlane

Legal Significance

Upon an intestate death, the property of the deceased formerly legally vested in the President of the Family Division until such a time that the Probate Registry made a grant of grant of administration to the deceased's personal representatives. The property now vests in the Public Trustee until a grant is made.

See also
 Lord Chief Justice
 Master of the Rolls
 President of the Queen's Bench Division
 Chancellor of the High Court

Notes

References
 David Butler and Gareth Butler, Twentieth Century British Political Facts 1900–2000, Macmillan, 2000
 Chris Cook and Brendan Keith, British Historical Facts 1830–1900, Macmillan, 1975

High Court of Justice
English family law